The 1970 1000km of Spa-Francorchamps was an endurance race held at the Circuit de Spa-Francorchamps, Belgium on May 17, 1970. It was the sixth round of the 1970 International Championship for Makes.

Pre-race
Prior to Formula One boycotting and then cancelling the 1969 Belgian Grand Prix because of the dangers of the ultra-high speed 8.7 mi (14.1 km) Spa-Francorchamps circuit, the track was fitted with Armco barriers in some places and was generally made safer. The layout had not been changed, however- and the circuit was still extremely fast and demanding; racing records were smashed at this race by the prototypes. The old Spa layout was just about flat out for the entire 8.7 mile distance and the circuit sped into the rural countryside; whereas now, the circuit stays inside a part of the mountainous Ardennes forest. Lost corners like Burnenville, Malmedy, the infamous Masta Kink, Stavelot and La Carriere were all 180+ mph and corners like Eau Rouge, Blanchimont and Clubhouse were 150+ mph. So every corner except the ultra-slow La Source hairpin was extremely fast and there was never any let-up for the cars on this circuit aside from La Source- and to add to the mental challenge, most of those corners had to be taken just slightly under flat out. Spa was the fastest circuit in Europe at that time, and the great mental challenge of this legendary Belgian circuit in those days was that every corner was just as important as the other- if a driver lifted even just a little bit through any of the high-speed bends, they would lose 2–3 seconds from their lap time, just from having done the slightest little motion that would affect how they were driving. And worse- if a driver made even the slightest mistake, they were very likely to have a huge, catastrophic high speed accident which in those safety-absent days almost always meant serious injury or death.

The works Porsche teams brought the 917K's back into action for this race. They had used the new 908/03's previously at the Targa Florio.

In qualifying, pole position went to the Gulf-Porsche 917K of Pedro Rodriguez/Leo Kinnunen, followed by the other Gulf-Porsche 917K of Jo Siffert/Brian Redman, the works Ferrari 512S of Jacky Ickx/John Surtees, a privately entered 917K of Helmut Kelleners/Jürgen Neuhaus, and another works Ferrari 512S of Ignazio Giunti/Nino Vaccarella. Rodriguez averaged over 157 mph (253 km/h)- a new average speed record on road circuits.

Both the Wyer Porsches and the Ferraris encountered problems. The Ferrari was unstable at medium speed; the Porsches shred their tires at the very fast bends. Both Siffert and Redman had very hairy moments. Rodriguez was aware of them but, according to John Horseman, he just responded by driving even faster.

Race
It rained before the start of the race, but by the time the race started, the track was already drying. The teams had to decide on what kind of tires to use. Siffert, Rodriguez and Ickx chose mix condition tires; most of the big bangers chose rain tires.

At the start, Siffert and Rodriguez were banging wheels going into Eau Rouge, with Siffert coming out best. At the second lap Ickx managed to get in touch with the Porsches. As at the third lap the big sports cars were lapping slower GTs, some changes in the lead happened. Siffert was passed by Rodriguez and Ickx, and then he got the lead again. He opened a gap of some seconds but never a large one. Rodriguez, trying hard, shred a tire. After one hour, the first pit stops took place. Siffert's pitstop was slow one and Ickx took the lead. For a while Siffert could not get near the Ferrari. But towards the end of his double stint, he got a message from the pits: an arrow was shown, meaning he was told to speed up and catch the Ferrari. Siffert did come closer to the Ferrari, and Rodriguez had also came closer, but neither were within striking distance. At the second pitstop, Ickx switched with John Surtees and Siffert with Redman. That day Surtees had, apparently, difficulty to deal with traffic and Redman had a very good stint. After some very exciting laps, Redman went ahead, Rodriguez came close, but he had to pit and later Kinnunen abandoned (gearbox). Redman took a large lead. At the last stint, Siffert was very far away but Ickx nevertheless tried hard to gain time. He did gain, but Siffert was informed of it by the pits and responded; the gap was stable from then on.

The race was one of the best examples of the great sports-car battles of the 1970s. Some of the top drivers in the world at the time were battling with each other (Siffert, Ickx, Rodriguez, Redman, Elford) at the most fearsomely fast circuit in Europe, and there was a Ferrari-Porsche confrontation. Rodriguez lapped Spa at 3:16.5, averaging 160.513 mph (258.321 km/h). So the Siffert-Redman Porsche won, and the Ickx-Surtees Ferrari was second.

Once the Formula One Belgian Grand Prix was held 3 weeks later (a race that Rodriguez won for BRM), Formula One cars struggled to get within 12 seconds of this time; although there was a chicane at Malmedy Corner just for the F1 race.

This was the 4th victory in a row for Wyer's team, so far they had won 5 of the 6 races in the championship.

This event set a record for the fastest ever road race in history, and the record would be broken twice more in successive years at the same circuit; and the eventual record stood for decades.

Official results

Not Classified

Did Not Finish

Statistics
Pole position: #25 John Wyer Automotive Engineering Porsche 917K (Pedro Rodriguez) - 3:19.8 (157.861 mph/254.054 km/h)
Fastest lap: #25 John Wyer Automotive Engineering Porsche 917K (Pedro Rodriguez)- 3:16.5 (160.513 mph/258.321 km/h)
Time taken for winning car to cover scheduled distance: 4 hours, 9 minutes and 47.8 seconds
Average Speed: 240.46 km/h (149.419 mph)
Weather conditions: Cloudy, wet at start; later drying

References

1000km
Spa
6 Hours of Spa-Francorchamps